Elections to Rochford Council were held on 5 May 1994.  One third of the council was up for election.

Results summary

Ward results

Downhall

Grange & Rawreth

Hawkwell East

Hockley East

Hullbridge Riverside

Hullbridge South

Lodge

Rayleigh Central

Rochford Eastwood

Rochford Roche

Rochford St. Andrew's

Trinity

Wheatley

Whitehouse

References

1994
1994 English local elections
1990s in Essex